The broad-headed spiny rat (Clyomys laticeps) is a spiny rat species from South America. The etymology of the species name is the Latin word laticeps meaning "wide-headed".

Description
They have short ears and limbs, and feet with powerful claws adapted for digging. The fur is interspersed with spines; it is grizzled reddish or yellowish and black over most of the body, and paler grey to almost white on the underparts.

Distribution and habitat
Within this region, they are found only in unflooded grasslands and open-canopy savannah woodlands, where the soil is soft and suitable for burrowing.

Biology and behaviour
These rats live in colonies and spend much of their life underground. They are herbivorous, and feed mainly on monocots. Births are probably seasonal, with one or two young being born each year, and weaned by the end of the wet season.

References

Echimyidae
Mammals described in 1909
Taxa named by Oldfield Thomas